Ahnee Sharon Freeman is a jazz pianist, French horn player and arranger.

Freeman played French horn for the jazz opera Escalator over the Hill, Gil Evans's 1973 album Svengali, and in 1983 she worked on a piece of jazz Christmas music. In 1982 she joined Charlie Haden's Liberation Music Orchestra and recorded three albums with the group between 1982 and 2004. Freeman has also worked and recorded with Frank Foster, Charles Mingus, Don Cherry, Muhal Richard Abrams, David Murray, and Lionel Hampton, and served as musical director for Don Pullen and for Beaver Harris' 360 Musical Experience.

Freeman was nominated for a Grammy for her arrangement of "Monk's Mood" for five French horns and rhythm section for Hal Willner's album, That's the Way I Feel Now: A Tribute to Thelonious Monk. She has been commissioned by the Jazz Composer's Orchestra, the Brooklyn Philharmonic, and the Harlem Piano Trio. She has been cited by Jazz Times as the top-rated established jazz French horn player.

Discography
With Carla Bley
Escalator over the Hill (JCOA, 1968–71)
With Gil Evans
Svengali (Atlantic, 1973)
With George Gruntz
First Prize (Enja, 1989)
With Charlie Haden
The Ballad of the Fallen (ECM, 1982)
The Montreal Tapes: Liberation Music Orchestra (Verve, 1989 [1999])
Not in Our Name (Verve, 2004)
With Leroy Jenkins
For Players Only (JCOA Records, 1975)
With Warren Smith
Composers Workshop Ensemble (Claves, 1968–82)
With Charles Sullivan
Genesis (Strata-East, 1974)

References

Bibliography

</ref>

Further reading
 Leslie Gourse, Madame Jazz. Oxford University Press. New York 1995. 

American women composers
American jazz composers
Women jazz composers
American jazz horn players
American jazz pianists
Women jazz pianists
Jazz arrangers
Living people
Jazz musicians from New York (state)
Fiorello H. LaGuardia High School alumni
Year of birth missing (living people)
21st-century American pianists
21st-century American women pianists
Women horn players